Wilson Waite Briggs (15 July 1942 – February 2005) was a Scottish footballer who played in the Football League for Aston Villa.

References

Scottish footballers
English Football League players
1942 births
2005 deaths
Arniston Rangers F.C. players
Aston Villa F.C. players
Falkirk F.C. players
East Fife F.C. players
Raith Rovers F.C. players
Sportspeople from Midlothian
Association football fullbacks
Scottish Football League players